Uliyazhathura  is a village in Thiruvananthapuram district in the state of Kerala, India. It is the most populous village in India.

Demographics
 India census, Uliyazhathura had a population of 27,714, with 13,651 males and 14,063 females.

References

Villages in Thiruvananthapuram district